Francesco Monti (1685 – 14 April 1768) was an Italian painter of the late Baroque.

Biography
Born in Bologna, he studied art for three years with Sigismondo Caula in Modena, and then starting in 1701 with Giovanni Gioseffo dal Sole in Bologna. His neo-Mannerist style was influenced by Donato Creti, Giuseppe Maria Crespi, and Parmigianino. A prolific painter, he worked in oil and in fresco.

His first known work, dating from 1713, is a Pentecost for the Basilica of San Prospero in Reggio Emilia. Other early works include a Rape of the Sabines for Count Ranuzzi and a Triumph of Mordecai for the court at Turin. Around this time, he was commissioned, along with other painters, to provide decorations for the Duke of Richmond's Goodwood Palace. He also executed commissions for a number of churches in Bolognia. Within a few years, he was admitted to the prestigious Accademia Clementina.

In 1738, he moved to Brescia, where he painted frescoes on the vault of the church of Santa Maria della Pace. He received other commissions from regional churches in San Zeno, Capo di Ponte, Chiari, Sale Marasino, and elsewhere. From 1740 onwards, he was also active in the area of Cremona.

Among his pupils were Gaetano Sabadini, his daughter Eleonora Monti, and the priest Antonio Montelatici.

He died in Brescia.

References

1683 births
1768 deaths
17th-century Italian painters
Italian male painters
18th-century Italian painters
Painters from Bologna
Rococo painters
Italian Baroque painters
18th-century Italian male artists